Magbanua (from Cebuano banwa with the meaning "city, town") is a Cebuano and Tagalog surname and may refer to:
 Rolando Magbanua (born 1985), Filipino boxer
 Teresa Magbanua (1868–1947), Filipino schoolteacher and military leader
 Vincent Magbanua (born 2000), Filipino child actor

References

Cebuano-language surnames
Tagalog-language surnames